TinkerPlots is exploratory data analysis and modeling software designed for use by students in grades 4 through university. It was designed by Clifford Konold and Craig Miller at the University of Massachusetts Amherst and is currently published by the Learn Troop.  It runs on Windows XP or later and Mac OS 10.4 or later. The program allows users to enter their own data, to import them from other applications or the Web, or to generate them using a sampling engine.  The program also comes with 50 multivariate data sets.

Using TinkerPlots, students can make a large variety of graphs, including those specified for middle school in Common Core State Standards for Mathematics But rather than making these graphs directly using commands, students construct them by progressively organizing cases using basic operations including “stack,” “order,” and “separate.”  Responding to these operations, case icons animate into different screen positions.  The interface was based on observations of people organizing “data cards” on a table to make graphs to answer specific questions 

Innovations of TinkerPlots include using a superimposed color gradient to detect covariation in two numeric attributes  and a “hat plot,” a reformulated and generalized version of the box plot.

The latest version is 2.3.4.  This version does not have substantively different features from versions 2.1 and 2.2, but has a number of bug fixes and enhancements to remain compatible with the latest versions of Windows and MacOS.

Critical acclaim 
ComputED 2010 Best Educational Software (BESSIE) Award
ComputED 2008 Education Software Review (EDDIE) Award.
Parents' Choice Silver Honor, 2005
Technology & Learning Award of Excellence, 2005

References

Additional References
Bakker, A., Derry, J., & Konold, C. (2006). Using technology to support diagrammatic reasoning about center and variation. In A. Rossman & B. Chance (Eds.) Proceedings of the 7th International Conference on Teaching Statistics (ICOTS) CD-ROM. Salvador, Bahai, Brazil, July 2–7, 2006.

Konold, C., & Lehrer, R. (in press).  Technology and mathematics education: An essay in honor of Jim Kaput. In L. English (Ed.), Handbook of International Research in Mathematics Education, (2nd edition).  New York: Routledge.

Rubin, A., Hammerman, J., & Konold, C. (2006). Exploring informal inference with interactive visualization software. In A. Rossman & B. Chance (Eds.) Proceedings of the 7th International Conference on Teaching Statistics (ICOTS) CD-ROM. Salvador, Bahai, Brazil, July 2–7, 2006.

Educational Materials using TinkerPlots
Konold, C. (2005). Exploring Data with TinkerPlots. Key Curriculum Press, . Contents: Getting Started, Learning TinkerPlots, Teaching with TinkerPlots, Activities, Activity Notes. 
Brodesky, A., Doherty, A., & Stoddard, J. (2008). Digging into Data with TinkerPlots. Key Curriculum Press, 225 pp. . Contents: (1) Comparisons, Distributions, and Line Plots: Exploring Data about Cats, (2) Comparisons and Boxplots: Investigating Data about Middle-School Students, (3) Comparisons using Formulas: Investigating Data about Signatures and Words, (4) Measures of Center and Histograms: Analyzing Safety Data, (5) Relationships between Attributes and Scatter Plots: Investigating Sports Data. 
 Walsh, T. (2009). The Survey Toolkit: Collecting Information, Analyzing Data, and Writing Reports. Contents: Choosing a Research Question, Developing and Giving the Survey,  Analyzing Survey Data, Sharing Results. 112pp. . 
 TinkerPlots Instructional Movies (2010). These 10 short movies where developed by the Statistics Education Research Group in 2010, and published with TinkerPlots, in QuickTime and AVI format.  Titles: TinkerPlots Basics, Adding Data, Making Common Graphs, Comparing Groups, Exploring Relationships 1, Exploring Relationships 2, Building a Data Factory, Simulating Group Differences, Probabilities Simulation, Creating Sample Spaces 
 TinkerPlots Workshop Guide (2007). . 
 TinkerPlots Walkthrough Guide and Quick Reference Card (included in Instructors Evaluation Edition).
 Free TinkerPlots Activities and Resources on Key Curriculum Website
 Free TinkerPlots Activities and Resources on University of Massachusetts Website

History 
 TinkerPlots 2.3.1 - 2.3.4, Published 2016-2018 by Learn Troop
 TinkerPlots 2.3, published August, 2015 by Learn Troop.
 TinkerPlots 2.2, published June, 2014 by University of Massachusetts Amherst.
 TinkerPlots 2.1, published November, 2012 by Key Curriculum.
 TinkerPlots 2.0, published April, 2011 by Key Curriculum.
 TinkerPlots 1.1, published June, 2009 by Key Curriculum.
 TinkerPlots 1.0, published September, 2004 by Key Curriculum.

External links
TinkerPlots 2.3 publishers web site at Learn Troop
TinkerPlots 2.2 publishers web site at University of Massachusetts Amherst
TinkerPlots 2.1 publishers web site at Key Curriculum

Exploratory data analysis
Plotting software
Educational software